Johannes Käis (26 December 1885 – 29 April 1950) was an Estonian educator. He was a leading figure of Estonian school renewal movement in the 1930s.

Käis was born in Rosma. In 1918 he graduated from Petrograd University. 1903–1917 he worked as an teacher in Latvia. In 1920 he returned to Estonia.

1931-1940 he was the scientific secretary of Estonian Teachers' Union.

Awards:
 1945 Estonian SSR merited teacher

References

1885 births
1950 deaths
Estonian educators
People from Põlva Parish